Jabal Lawa's, also known as Mount Loess, is a mountain in Saudi Arabia.
It is 2,558 m (8,392 ft) high, and is located in a sub-range of the Sarawat mountain range, near the city of Al Bahah in the Al Bahah Region.

References

Lawa
Al-Bahah Province